, is a Japanese tokusatsu superhero television series. It is the fourteenth installment in the Kamen Rider Series. It aired on TV Asahi from January 25, 2004 to January 23, 2005. It is a joint collaboration between Ishimori Productions and Toei. Along with the standard insect motif of the Kamen Rider series, Kamen Rider Blade also uses a playing card motif. Each Rider is assigned one of the suits from a deck of cards. It aired as a part of TV Asahi's 2004 Super Hero Time block with Tokusou Sentai Dekaranger.

Blade was later released on DVD by Toei. There were twelve volumes released with the first eleven having four episodes per DVD and the twelfth volume with five episodes.

Story

Ten thousand years ago, a massive battle known as the Battle Royal was fought by fifty-two Undead, each representing a species fighting for dominance over all others. The winner was the Human Undead, known as Category Two of Hearts, giving dominion of the Earth to humanity. In the present day, archaeologists discover the sealed Undead, and accidentally set them free. Thus, a new Battle Royal begins.

Having developed the Rider System, based on the Joker's ability to copy sealed Undead, the organization BOARD (Board Of Archaeological Research Department) equips two young men, who become Kamen Riders: Kazuma Kenzaki and Sakuya Tachibana fight together as Kamen Rider Blade and Kamen Rider Garren to protect humans from Undead and seal them. Also fighting Undead is the mysterious Hajime Aikawa as Kamen Rider Chalice, whose purpose is unknown. In addition, a young man named Mutsuki Kamijo struggles to free himself from the control of the sealed Undead powering his own Undead-made Rider System, fighting as Kamen Rider Leangle.

Episodes

Films

Kamen Rider Blade: Missing Ace

 is the theatrical release, first released in theaters on September 11, 2004.

Deviating from the series finale, Kazuma was forced to seal away Hajime during their final battle. Four years later, the characters have moved on with their lives: Kazuma is a garbage man, Mutsuki has graduated from high school, and Kotarō has published a book about the Kamen Riders to great success, but on Amane's upcoming birthday, it was revealed that she has become a delinquent without the emotional support of Hajime. The Undead have been re-released, and a new trio of Kamen Riders—Glaive, Larc and Lance—have emerged from BOARD, now led by Tachibana. After recapturing two of the Category Aces, Kazuma and Mutsuki join with the new Riders. When all the Undead are sealed once more, Glaive reveals himself to be the Albino Joker, a white version of the original Joker, and seals Amane in the Vanity Card in his scheme to obtain ultimate power. In order to free Amane from the card, Hajime is unsealed from the Joker Card and the four Riders are again united, intent on saving Amane and stopping the Albino Joker.

Super Hero Taisen GP

 is the 2015 entry of the "Super Hero Taisen" film series, featuring the cast of Kamen Rider Drive and the appearance of Kamen Rider 3, which was originally created by Shotaro Ishinomori for the one-shot 1972 manga . Kousei Amano, Takayuki Tsubaki, Ryoji Morimoto and Takahiro Hojo reprised their roles in this film, which opened in theaters on March 21, 2015.

V-Cinema
It was reported from the people who had attended Kamen Rider Blade Special Off Meeting in 2016 had reported that the members have announced the production of V-Cinema for Kamen Rider Blade. Ryoji Morimoto had said that the V-Cinema is just one step away. Takayuki Tsubaki had also told there since there was demand of Kamen Rider Garren's King form in various social networks, there are chances that this form may appear in the V-Cinema.

Specials
 is a Hyper Battle Video, wherein a Trial-series cyborg pretends to be Kenzaki and copies the Blay Rouzer, starting a fight with the real Kenzaki. During their battle, Tachibana and Mutsuki are unable to tell the two apart, which results in their humorously attacking the real Kenzaki (shooting him in the rear end and bashing him over the head), before Hajime steps in and reveals the impostor. As with all Hyper Battle Videos, this serves as a device to exposit the Rider's various powers and abilities.

Kamen Rider Blade: New Generation is a television special made of a collection of vignettes which aired following certain episodes of Kamen Rider Blade, following the history of Kamen Riders Glaive, L'arc, and Lance. This is a direct tie-in to the movie Missing Ace.

Production
The Kamen Rider Blade trademark was registered by Toei on November 10, 2003.

S.I.C. Hero Saga
The S.I.C. Hero Saga side story for Blade is titled  follows the story of the series after the finale and features characters from Missing Ace. Two other special editions of the Hero Saga stories also feature Blade characters: Hero Saga Special Edition: King featuring  and Hero Saga Special Edition: Clover featuring . Day After Tomorrow ran in the February through May 2007 issues of Monthly Hobby Japan magazine. King was featured in the May 2008 issue and Clover was featured in the June 2008 issue.

Chapter titles

Novel
, written by Junichi Miyashita, is part of a series of spin-off novel adaptations of the Heisei Era Kamen Rider Series. This sequel to the TV series takes place 300 years following the television series finale. It chronicles Kenzaki's quest to end his life as the Navy Joker after three centuries. In one instance, Kenzaki is captured by a criminal organization and is tortured, but still does not die.

Later in the novel, he becomes a war photographer, and all he sees is death. He then enlists in the army for a foreign country, steps on landmines and explodes. Also named are the new Garren and Leangle, Tachihara and Satsuki.

The only returning characters are Kenzaki and Hajime. Kenzaki has a weaker personality compared to the TV series due to living for a long time and seeing a lot of horrible things. Satsuki, the new Leangle's treated the same like the original Leangle, Mutsuki.

The novel was released on February 28, 2013.

Cast
: 
:  (Played as "Hironari Amano")
, : 
: 
: 
: 
: 
: 
: 
: 
: 
: 
: 
: 
: 
: 
: 
: 
: 
Rouzer Voice: 
Rouze Absorber Voice, King Rouzer Voice: 
Narration:

Songs
Opening themes
"Round ZERO~BLADE BRAVE"
Lyrics: Shoko Fujibayashi
Composition: Katsuya Yoshida
Arrangement: Akio Kondō
Artist: Nanase Aikawa
Episodes: 1 - 30
"ELEMENTS"
Lyrics: Shoko Fujibayashi
Composition: Miki Fushisue
Arrangement: RIDER CHIPS & Cher Watanabe
Artist: RIDER CHIPS featuring Ricky
Episodes: 31 - 49
After his performance in "ELEMENTS," Ricky was made RIDER CHIPS' permanent vocalist.

Insert themes

Lyrics: Shoko Fujibayashi
Composition: Cher Watanabe
Arrangement: Akio Kondō
Artist: Ricky
Episodes: 2 - 23
"Rebirth"
Lyrics: Shoko Fujibayashi
Composition: Yukari Aono
Arrangement: Cher Watanabe
Artist: Sakuya Tachibana (Kousei Amano)
Episodes: 23 - 30, 47
"Take it a Try"
Lyrics: Shoko Fujibayashi
Composition & Arrangement: Cher Watanabe
Artist: Hajime Aikawa (Ryoji Morimoto)
Episodes: 31 - 49

Video game
A video game based on the series was produced by Bandai for the PlayStation 2. It is an action game that featured many of the characters from the TV series. It was released only in Japan near the end of the TV series on December 9, 2004.

International broadcasts

References

External links

Kamen Rider Blade DVD & Blu-ray Box
Kamen Rider Blade for the PlayStation 2

 
2004 Japanese television series debuts
2005 Japanese television series endings
Fiction with alternate endings
Film and television memes
Kamen Rider television series
Television shows about poker